Waar 2 is an upcoming Pakistani action-thriller film directed & written by Hassan Rana. It is a sequel to Bilal Lashari's directed 2013 film Waar. The film stars Shaan Shahid returning as Major Mujtaba Rizvi, Aleeze Nasser, Agha Haris Durrani and Bilal Ashraf. Unlike the original film, which was based on true events, the sequel will be a complete fictional story. The film was originally going to be released in 2017. As of 2022, the film has yet to have a release date.

Cast  
Shaan Shahid as Major Mujtaba Rizvi, a Pakistan Army Officer
Hassan Rana as Taha Ali, director of CTG
Aleeze Nasser
Bilal Ashraf
Agha Haris Durrani

Production 
In May 2015, it was revealed that Hassan Rana wrote the script and would direct the sequel film, he would be returning to reprise his previous role, Ayesha Omer will be a new addition in the film along with newcomers Agha Haris Durrani, Bilal Ashraf and Aleeze Nasser. Waqas Rana would also be serving as the producer and Director of Photography of the film, and he revealed that four foreign actors were also cast in the film. The film will also be filmed in Russia, Yugoslavia, United Kingdom and Turkey. Bilal Lashari, the director of the prequel wanted to return for the sequel but due to scheduling conflicts, he had to drop out.

Filming 
Waar 2 was previously all set to go into production in 2014. The movie was set be shot in international locations including Russia, Yugoslavia, United Kingdom and Turkey.

Principal photography on the film began in late-June 2015 in London. In August 2015, filming took place at the K2 base camp.

References

External links

Unreleased Pakistani films
MindWorks Media films
Pakistani action thriller films
Films shot in London
Films shot in Gilgit-Baltistan
Films directed by Hassan Rana
Pakistani spy thriller films